Mai Charoenpura (born January 5, 1969), also known by the former stage name Mai Siriwimol, is a Thai singer and actress.

Biography

Early life
Born in Bangkok, Thailand, she is one of four daughters of Thai actor Surin Charoenpura (stage name: Ruj Ronnapop) and Winee Sontikool. She has three sisters, Venic White, Vipavee Maguire, and a half sister, actress Intira Charoenpura. Mai was educated in England, at Farringtons School.

Music career
As a singer, since 1989 Charoenpura has released dozens of albums, music videos and performed in many concerts.

In 2007, Charoenpura performed in Manchester, for a concert organized by former Thai prime minister Thaksin Shinawatra, to celebrate his ownership of Manchester City F.C.

Original Album
1st.	ไม้ม้วน	(1989, 2532)
2nd.	ไม้ขีดไฟ	(1990, 2533)	
3rd.	ความลับสุดขอบฟ้า	(1992, 2535)
4th.	ผีเสื้อกับพายุ	(1994, 2537)	
5th.	ชีวิตใหม่	(1997, 2540)	
6th.	แผลงฤทธิ์	(1998, 2541)	
7th.	คนเดียวในหัวใจ (2002, 2545)	
8th.	Always ใหม่เสมอ	(2006, 2549)

Acting career
Since the 1980s, Charoenpura has acted in numerous roles on Thai television and in films.

As an actress, she's best known for her role as 'Pring' in Khon Rerng Muang.  She made the role her own so much so that she played 'Pring' twice in two different made-for-TV remakes consecutively in 1988 and 2002. She came to international notice for her portrayal of the villainous Lady Srisudachan in the 2001 film, The Legend of Suriyothai, directed by Chatrichalerm Yukol, and released theatrically in the United States in 2003.

In 2010 Charoenpura appeared in the anthology horror film Die a Violent Death, alongside Akara Amarttayakul and Supaksorn Chaimongkol.

Among her other movies are Memory and Meat Grinder.
 
After her long hiatus from acting career, she starred in Channel 3 drama Krong Kam as Yoi in 2019.

Filmography

Television dramas

 2019 Krong Kam (กรงกรรม) (Act Art Generation/Ch.3) as Yoi (ย้อย อัศวรุ่งเรืองกิจ) with Prin Wikran
 2022 Sarb Sorn Ruk (สาปซ่อนรัก) (TV Scene & Picture/Ch.3) as Dujhong (Hong) (ดุจหงส์ ยินดีพงษ์ปรีชา (คุณนายหงส์)) with สุรจิต บุญญานนท์

Television series
 20  (/) as (Cameo)
 20  (/) as 

Television sitcom
 1989  (ตะกายดาว ตอนที่ 6 ดาวหลบใน) (GMM Grammy/Ch.9) as (Cameo)

Movies
 2001 The Legend of Suriyothai as 
 2008 Memory as 
 2009 Meat Grinder as 
 2010 Die a Violent Death as 
 2011 Mai Ka Mam Don Ka Don as 

Music Video 
 1999 Glub Mai Dai Pai Mai Teung - Thongchai McIntyre (กลับไม่ได้ ไปไม่ถึง - ธงไชย แมคอินไตย์) (GMM Grammy/YouTube:GMM GRAMMY OFFICIAL)
 2014 Kwan Thai Jai Nueng Deaw - Carabao (ขวานไทยใจหนึ่งเดียว - คาราบาว) (Warner Music (Thailand)/YouTube:Carabao Official)

References

External links
 

1969 births
Living people
Mai Charoenpura
Mai Charoenpura
Mai Charoenpura
Mai Charoenpura
Mai Charoenpura
Mai Charoenpura
Mai Charoenpura
Mai Charoenpura
Mai Charoenpura
Mai Charoenpura
Mai Charoenpura